Sebastjan Vogrinčič (born 7 August 1976) is a retired Slovenian football midfielder.

References

1976 births
Living people
Slovenian footballers
NK Mura players
NK Nafta Lendava players
SV Stegersbach players
ND Mura 05 players
Association football midfielders
Slovenian expatriate footballers
Expatriate footballers in Austria
Slovenian expatriate sportspeople in Austria
Slovenian PrvaLiga players